A Fachwirt is a professional certification in Germany allocated to level 6 of the European Qualifications Framework, where it is translated as business management specialist. 

To facilitate the understanding of the concept internationally, the Association of German Chambers of Industry and Commerce (Deutscher Industrie- und Handelskammertag, DIHK) proposed bachelor professional as an English translation. However, so as to avoid confusion of academic degrees, this proposal was rejected by the German state ministers of education. This has not stopped IHK institutions from issuing certificates in English showing the title "bachelor professional" with a note at the bottom of the page that it is not a university degree. Holders of the certificate must be careful not use the title in relation to someone located in Germany and thus violate section 132a (2) of the German Penal Code. Applying for a position outside Germany using the certificate is arguably not affected, and thus serves the purpose of the translation. A legally grey area is the use on career networks on the Internet (which is actually quite common), where both German and foreign companies are targeted. The German government envisages to introduce "bachelor professional" as an English translation for all Level 6 qualifications in an amendment of the Vocational Training Act in 2020 under the vocational training act.

Characteristics 

The Fachwirt provides a form of continuing professional development, which is usually pursued following an apprenticeship and at least one year of professional experience in a recognized occupation. The final examinations, regulated by the German Vocational Training Act, are carried out by specialized committees of the German Chambers of Commerce and Industry (DIHK). Learning objectives, defined by DIHK created frameworks, require knowledge in business administration as well as practical and theoretical skills in a particular industrial sector (e.g. Handelsfachwirt for Trade and Commerce, Verkehrsfachwirt for Transport Management, Fachwirt im Sozial- und Gesundheitswesen for Social and Health Services). 

Although not a prerequisite for admission to the final exams, training courses are offered by several, primarily private educational institutions. Depending on the specialization, the curricula suggest coursework of 400 to 800 hours, which is taught in 6 to 24 months of full-time or part-time study, respectively, comparable to almost a full term at university which carries 30  ECTS representative of 900 hours of course work.

References 

Education in Germany
Business qualifications
Management education